Barlerieae is a tribe of flowering plants in the family Acanthaceae.

Taxonomy
Barlerieae contains the following genera:
 Lasiocladus
 Barleriola
 Boutonia
 Chroesthes
 Hulemacanthus
 Pericalypta
 Borneacanthus
 Schaueriopsis
 Pseudodicliptera
 Crabbea
 Podorungia
 Lepidagathis
 Lophostachys
 Barleria

References

Acanthaceae
Asterid tribes